The Future Movement is a Lebanese political party affiliated with the Sunni sect. The party was founded as a coalition in 1995 led by Rafic Hariri but was officially founded in 2007. The party was led by Saad Hariri.
 
The party is the largest member of the March 14 Alliance, which governed Lebanon from 2005 to 2018 except for the period 2011–2013. The coalition lost its majority in the 2018 parliamentary elections.

In mid-October 2019, a popular protest movement began calling for increased accountability and transparency in politics. On 29 October, Chairman Hariri offered his resignation as a concession, saying "This is in response to the will and demand of the thousands of Lebanese demanding change". However, as of December 2019, President Michel Aoun has yet to accept his resignation, and it is possible the Hariri will suspend his resignation a second time. His purported resignation has, however, been confirmed as a stunt by one of his aides.

The party was officially founded in August 2007, yet it was only declared on April 5, 2009, in a convention held at the BIEL convention center in Beirut. The Future Movement is economically liberal and affiliated with the Sunni Muslim sect.
The party is a full member of the Liberal International and a founding member of Al Hurriya Liberal Network.

Saad Hariri surprisingly announced his retirement from politics on 24 January 2022. The Future Movement announced it would thereafter not take part in the 2022 Lebanese general election.

Politics
The Future Movement was founded in 2007 and was part of the March 14 Alliance that includes, amongst many groups, the Christians associated with the Lebanese Forces and Kataeb parties (main 2 allies of FM), and the majority Druze Progressive Socialist Party.  The main opponent of Future Movement is the March 8 Alliance, most important parts being Free Patriotic Movement (FPM) led by General Michel Aoun and the Shia Hezbollah and Amal Movements.

Opposition to Hezbollah
In 2011, an official of the Future Movement warned that Shia Hezbollah "has all the characteristics of a terrorist party", and that Hezbollah is moving Lebanon toward the Iranian Shi'ite Islamic system of government.

On 23 June 2013, Future Movement MP Nohad El Machnouk, who was appointed as the minister of interior and municipalities in Prime Minister Tamam Salam's government on 15-2-2014, told Murr TV that Lebanon is under occupation by Hezbollah.

Media
The Future Movement has an important media presence in Lebanon and internationally. Media outlets expressing the Movement's views include Future Television, Future News, Radio Orient and Al Mustaqbal daily newspaper.

Future Television was a Lebanese owned and operated company founded in 1993. First launched in Lebanon on February 15, 1993, Future Television, although the youngest of the Lebanese stations back then, became the nation's fastest growing station. In September 2019, Lebanese Prime Minister and party leader Saad Hariri announced the suspension of work at his Future TV satellite television channel after 26 years of broadcasting, citing financial reasons for halting operations.

Future Youth
The Future Movement's youth wing, Future Youth, is a member of the International Federation of Liberal Youth (IFLRY).

Election summary

2018 
At a ceremony in the Seaside Pavilion on 11 March 2018 the candidates and electoral platform of the Future Movement were presented. The party fielded 37 candidates, out of whom 21 were newcomers. The political newcomers included lawyer Roula Tabash Jaroudi in Beirut II and civil society activist Chadi Nacchabe in Tripoli.

The electoral slogan of the party was 'Blue Talisman' (kharzé zar’a). Commenting on the slogan party leader Saad Hariri stated that "[the] Future Movement is a Talisman (blue bead) that you put in the ballot box, to protect the country. For that reason, our slogan is the protection of Lebanon and the symbol is the Talisman. You will draw the Talisman with your activity, with your energy, with your daily small and large contributions to the electoral machine, in your dialogue with people, in working for each candidate on the Future lists."

The Future Movement and the Lebanese Forces negotiated for weeks on forming an electoral alliance, but the effort failed as relations between Future leader Saad Hariri and LF leader Samir Geagea deteriorated on issues relating to Hariri's visit to Saudi Arabia.

2022 
After Hariri's boycott, many Sunnis in North II and Akkar chose to follow boycott as well, after which his resignation created a large vacuum in Sunni politics.

Many Ex-Future politicians headed their own blocs, such as Bahaa Hariri and Fouad Sinora, and managed to secure 7 seats of the candidates that were affiliated with the Future Movement in parliament.

Though Mohammad Kabbara has been affiliated with Hariri for years, his son Abdelkarim Kabbara opted to go onboard the Mikati-Backed list as an independent unrelated to the Future Movement.

References

External links
Future Movement Official Web Site
Future Movement Official forum
Future Movement Sweden and north Scandinavia
Future Movement USA Official Web Site

& www.futuremovementaustralia.com/ Future Movement Australia NSW Web Site

2007 establishments in Lebanon
Classical liberal parties
Liberal International
Liberal parties in Lebanon
March 14 Alliance
Future Movement
Political parties established in 2007